The Green World is the fourth studio album by American folk music singer-songwriter Dar Williams, released in 2000.

While writing songs for the album, Williams incorporated her ongoing interest in religion into the process. One particular inspiration was the book Drawing Down the Moon by Margot Adler.

"Calling the Moon" was covered by Richard Shindell on the album Somewhere Near Paterson.

Track listing
All songs written by Dar Williams
 "Playing to the Firmament" – 3:53
 "And a God Descended" – 4:15
 "After All" – 4:48
 "What Do You Love More Than Love" – 3:17
 "Spring Street" – 4:52
 "We Learned the Sea" – 2:34
 "I Won't Be Your Yoko Ono" – 3:38
 "Calling the Moon" – 5:02
 "I Had No Right" – 3:25
 "It Happens Every Day" – 3:53
 "Another Mystery" – 3:03

Personnel
Dar Williams – acoustic guitar, vocals
Steve Holley – drums
Rob Hyman – organ
Graham Maby – bass guitar
David Mansfield – violin, string arrangements
Billy Masters – electric guitar
Doug Plavin – percussion
Steuart Smith – guitar, accordion, Wurlitzer, electric sitar
Jane Scarpantoni – cello

References

Dar Williams albums
Razor & Tie albums
2000 albums
Albums produced by Stewart Lerman